Alois Dauenhauer (17 July 1929 – 13 November 2022) was a German politician. A member of the Christian Democratic Union, he served in the Landtag of Rhineland-Palatinate from 1975 to 1991.

Dauenhauer died on 13 November 2022, at the age of 93.

References

1929 births
2022 deaths
Christian Democratic Union of Germany politicians
Members of the Landtag of Rhineland-Palatinate
Officers Crosses of the Order of Merit of the Federal Republic of Germany
People from Rodalben
20th-century German politicians